Douglas M. King, nicknamed "Ardun Doug", (May 6, 1937 – September 16, 2011) was an American drag racer and engine builder.

King drove dragsters powered by Ardun hemi-headed flathead V8s. He continued to race as late as 2004.

He also built the Ardun engine for the record-setting Frank Schonig-built 1927 Ford Model T Lakes roadster driven by Luke Balogh.

Notes

External links 
Jalopyjournal.com
Hotrodhotline.com
Hot Rod magazine online (King Ardun)
 Hot Rod magazine online (Lakes racing)
Racesir.com

American racing drivers
Dragster drivers
2011 deaths
1937 births